The 18th century lasted from January 1, 1701 (MDCCI) to December 31, 1800 (MDCCC). During the 18th century, elements of Enlightenment thinking culminated in the American, French, and Haitian Revolutions. During the century, slave trading and human trafficking expanded across the shores of the Atlantic, while declining in Russia, China, and Korea. Revolutions began to challenge the legitimacy of monarchical and aristocratic power structures, including the structures and beliefs that supported slavery. The Industrial Revolution began during mid-century, leading to radical changes in human society and the environment.

Western historians have occasionally defined the 18th century otherwise for the purposes of their work. For example, the "short" 18th century may be defined as 1715–1789, denoting the period of time between the death of Louis XIV of France and the start of the French Revolution, with an emphasis on directly interconnected events. To historians who expand the century to include larger historical movements, the "long" 18th century may run from the Glorious Revolution of 1688 to the Battle of Waterloo in 1815 or even later.

The period is also known as the "century of lights" or the "century of reason". In continental Europe, philosophers dreamed of a brighter age. For some, this dream turned into a reality with the French Revolution of 1789, though this was later compromised by the excesses of the Reign of Terror. At first, many monarchies of Europe embraced Enlightenment ideals, but in the wake of the French Revolution they feared loss of power and formed broad coalitions to oppose the French Republic in the French Revolutionary Wars.

The 18th century also marked the end of the Polish–Lithuanian Commonwealth as an independent state. Its semi-democratic government system was not robust enough to rival the neighboring states of the Prussia, Russia, and Austria, which partitioned the Polish–Lithuanian Commonwealth between themselves, changing the landscape of Central Europe and politics for the next hundred years.

The Ottoman Empire experienced an unprecedented period of peace and economic expansion, taking part in no European wars from 1740 to 1768. As a result, the empire was not exposed to Europe's military improvements of the Seven Years' War. The Ottoman Empire military consequently lagged behind and suffered several defeats against Russia in the second half of the century. In Southwest and Central Asia, Nader Shah led successful military campaigns and major invasions, which indirectly led to the founding of the Durrani Empire.

The European colonization of the Americas and other parts of the world intensified and associated mass migrations of people grew in size as part of the Age of Sail. European colonization intensified in present-day Indonesia, where the Dutch East India Company established increasing levels of control over the Mataram Sultanate. Mainland Southeast Asia would be embroiled in the Konbaung–Ayutthaya Wars and the Tây Sơn rebellion, while in East Asia, the century marked the High Qing era and the continual seclusion policies of the Tokugawa shogunate.

Various conflicts throughout the century, including the War of the Spanish Succession and the French and Indian War saw Great Britain triumphing over its European rivals to become the preeminent colonial power in Europe. However, Britain lost its colonies in North America after the American Revolutionary War, which went on to form the United States, initiating the decolonization of the Americas. The European colonization of Australia and New Zealand began during the late half of the century.

In the Indian subcontinent, the death of Mughal emperor Aurangzeb marked the end of medieval India and the beginning of an increasing level of European influence and control in the region, which coincided with a period of rapid Maratha expansion. After the reign of Aurangzeb, the Mughal Empire became less powerful. In 1739, Nader Shah invaded and defeated the Mughal Empire. Later, his general Ahmad Shah Abdali scored another defeat against the Mughals in the Third Battle of Panipat in 1761. By the middle of the century, the British East India Company began to conquer the eastern parts of India, a process which accelerated after their victory over the Mughal emperor, Nawab of Bengal and their French allies at the Battle of Plassey. Mughal emperor transformed into mere puppet of British.  By the end of the century, Company rule in India had come to cover more regions within South Asia, the British would also expand to the south, participating in the Anglo-Mysore Wars against the Kingdom of Mysore, governed by Tipu Sultan and his father Hyder Ali.

Events

1701–1750

 1700–1721: Great Northern War between the Russian and Swedish Empires.
 1701: Kingdom of Prussia declared under King Frederick I.
 1701–1714: The War of the Spanish Succession is fought, involving most of continental Europe.
 1702–1715: Camisard rebellion in France.
 1703: Saint Petersburg is founded by Peter the Great; it is the Russian capital until 1918.
 1703–1711: The Rákóczi uprising against the Habsburg monarchy.
 1704: End of Japan's Genroku period.
 1704: First Javanese War of Succession.
 1706–1713: The War of the Spanish Succession: French troops defeated at the battles of Ramillies and Turin.
 1707: Death of Mughal Emperor Aurangzeb leads to the fragmentation of the Mughal Empire.
 1707: The Act of Union is passed, merging the Scottish and English Parliaments, thus establishing the Kingdom of Great Britain.
 1708: The Company of Merchants of London Trading into the East Indies and English Company Trading to the East Indies merge to form the United Company of Merchants of England Trading to the East Indies.
 1708–1709: Famine kills one-third of East Prussia's population.
 1709: Foundation of the Hotak Afghan Empire.
 1709: The Great Frost of 1709 marks the coldest winter in 500 years, contributing to the defeat of Sweden at Poltava.
 1710: The world's first copyright legislation, Britain's Statute of Anne, takes effect.
 1710–1711: Ottoman Empire fights Russia in the Russo-Turkish War and regains Azov.
 1711: Bukhara Khanate dissolves as local begs seize power.
 1711–1715: Tuscarora War between British, Dutch, and German settlers and the Tuscarora people of North Carolina.
 1713: The Kangxi Emperor acknowledges the full recovery of the Chinese economy since its apex during the Ming. 
 1714: In Amsterdam, Daniel Gabriel Fahrenheit invents the mercury-in-glass thermometer, which remains the most reliable and accurate thermometer until the electronic era.
 1715: The first Jacobite rising breaks out; the British halt the Jacobite advance at the Battle of Sheriffmuir; Battle of Preston.
 1716: Establishment of the Sikh Confederacy along the present-day India-Pakistan border.
 1716–1718: Austro-Venetian-Turkish War.
 1718: The city of New Orleans is founded by the French in North America.
 1718–1720: War of the Quadruple Alliance between Spain, France, Britain, Austria, and the Netherlands.
 1718–1730: Tulip period of the Ottoman Empire.
 1719: Second Javanese War of Succession.
 1720: The South Sea Bubble.
 1720–1721: The Great Plague of Marseille.
 1720: Qing forces oust Dzungar invaders from Tibet.
 1721: The Treaty of Nystad is signed, ending the Great Northern War.
 1721: Sack of Shamakhi, massacre of its Shia population by Sunni Lezgins.
 1722: Siege of Isfahan results in the handover of Iran to the Hotaki Afghans.
 1722–1723: Russo-Persian War.
 1722–1725: Controversy over William Wood's halfpence leads to the Drapier's Letters and begins the Irish economic independence from England movement.
 1723: Slavery is abolished in Russia; Peter the Great converts household slaves into house serfs.
 1723–1730: The "Great Disaster", an invasion of Kazakh territories by the Dzungars.
 1723–1732: The Qing and the Dzungars fight a series of wars across Qinghai, Dzungaria, and Outer Mongolia, with inconclusive results.
 1724: Daniel Gabriel Fahrenheit proposes the Fahrenheit temperature scale.
 1725: Austro-Spanish alliance revived. Russia joins in 1726.
 1727–1729: Anglo-Spanish War ends inconclusively.

 1730: Mahmud I takes over Ottoman Empire after the Patrona Halil revolt, ending the Tulip period.
 1730–1760: The First Great Awakening takes place in Great Britain and North America.
 1732–1734: Crimean Tatar raids into Russia.
1733–1738: War of the Polish Succession.
 1735–1739: Austro-Russo-Turkish War.
 1735–1799: The Qianlong Emperor of China oversees a huge expansion in territory.
 1738–1756: Famine across the Sahel; half the population of Timbuktu dies.
 1737–1738: Hotaki Afghan Empire ends after the Siege of Kandahar by Nader Shah.
 1739: Great Britain and Spain fight the War of Jenkins' Ear in the Caribbean.
 1739: Nader Shah defeats a pan-Indian army of 300,000 at the Battle of Karnal. Taxation is stopped in Iran for three years.

 1739–1740: Nader Shah's Sindh expedition.
 1740: Great Awakening, George Whitefield
 1740–1741: Famine in Ireland kills 20 percent of the population.
 1741–1743: Iran invades Uzbekistan, Khwarazm, Dagestan, and Oman.
 1741–1751: Maratha invasions of Bengal.
 1740–1748: War of the Austrian Succession.
 1742: 
 Marvel's Mill, the first water-powered cotton mill, begins operation in England.
 Anders Celsius proposes an inverted form of the centigrade temperature, which is later renamed Celsius in his honor.
 1742: Premiere of Handel's Messiah
 1743–1746: Another Ottoman-Persian War involves 375,000 men but ultimately ends in a stalemate.
 1744: The First Saudi State is founded by Mohammed Ibn Saud.
 1744: Battle of Toulon is fought off the coast of France.
 1744–1748: The First Carnatic War is fought between the British, the French, the Marathas, and Mysore in India.
 1745: Second Jacobite rising is begun by Charles Edward Stuart in Scotland.
 1747: The Durrani Empire is founded by Ahmad Shah Durrani.
 1748: The Treaty of Aix-La-Chapelle ends the War of the Austrian Succession and First Carnatic War.
 1748–1754: The Second Carnatic War is fought between the British, the French, the Marathas, and Mysore in India.
 1750: Peak of the Little Ice Age.

1751–1800
 1752: The British Empire adopts the Gregorian Calendar, skipping 11 days from September 3 to September 13. On the calendar, September 2 is followed directly by September 14.
 1754: The Treaty of Pondicherry ends the Second Carnatic War and recognizes Muhammed Ali Khan Wallajah as Nawab of the Carnatic.
 1754: King's College is founded by a royal charter of George II of Great Britain.
 1754–1763: The French and Indian War, the North American chapter of the Seven Years' War, is fought in colonial North America, mostly by the French and their allies against the English and their allies.
 1755: The great Lisbon earthquake destroys most of Portugal's capital and kills up to 100,000.
 1755: The Dzungar genocide depopulates much of northern Xinjiang, allowing for Han, Uyghur, Khalkha Mongol, and Manchu colonization.
 1755–1763: The Great Upheaval forces transfer of the French Acadian population from Nova Scotia and New Brunswick.
 1756–1763: The Seven Years' War is fought among European powers in various theaters around the world.
 1756–1763: The Third Carnatic War is fought between the British, the French, and Mysore in India.
 1757: British conquest of Bengal.

 1760: George III becomes King of Britain.
 1761: Maratha Empire defeated at Battle of Panipat.
 1762–1796: Reign of Catherine the Great of Russia.
 1763: The Treaty of Paris ends the Seven Years' War and Third Carnatic War.
 1764: The Mughals are defeated at the Battle of Buxar.
 1765: The Stamp Act is introduced into the American colonies by the British Parliament.
 1765–1767: The Burmese invade Thailand and utterly destroy Attuthaya.
 1765–1769: Burma under Hsinbyushin repels four invasions from Qing China, securing hegemony over the Shan states.
 1766: Christian VII becomes king of Denmark. He was king of Denmark to 1808.
 1766–1799: Anglo-Mysore Wars.
 1767: Taksin expels Burmese invaders and reunites Thailand under an authoritarian regime.
 1768–1772: War of the Bar Confederation.
 1768–1774: Russo-Turkish War.
 1769: Spanish missionaries establish the first of 21 missions in California.
 1769–1770: James Cook explores and maps New Zealand and Australia.
 1769–1773: The Bengal famine of 1770 kills one-third of the Bengal population.
 1769: The French East India Company dissolves, only to be revived in 1785.
 1769: French expeditions capture clove plants in Ambon, ending the VOC monopoly of the plant. (to 1772)

 1770–1771: Famine in Czech lands kills hundreds of thousands.
 1771: The Plague Riot in Moscow.
 1771: The Kalmyk Khanate dissolves as the territory becomes colonized by Russians. More than a hundred thousand Kalmyks migrate back to Qing Dzungaria.
 1772: Gustav III of Sweden stages a coup d'état, becoming almost an absolute monarch.
 1772–1779: Maratha Empire fights Britain and Raghunathrao's forces during the First Anglo-Maratha War.
 1772–1795: The Partitions of Poland end the Polish–Lithuanian Commonwealth and erase Poland from the map for 123 years.
 1773–1775: Pugachev's Rebellion, the largest peasant revolt in Russian history.
 1773: East India Company starts operations in Bengal to smuggle opium into China.
 1775: Russia imposes a reduction in autonomy on the Zaporizhian Cossacks of Ukraine. 
 1775–1782: First Anglo-Maratha War.
 1775–1783: American Revolutionary War.
 1776: Several Kongsi Republics are founded by Chinese settlers in the island of Borneo. They are some of the first democracies in Asia.
 1776–1777: A Spanish-Portuguese War occurs over land in the South American frontiers.
 1776: Illuminati founded by Adam Weishaupt.
 1776: The United States Declaration of Independence is adopted by the Continental Congress in Philadelphia.
 1776: Adam Smith publishes The Wealth of Nations.
 1778: James Cook becomes the first European to land on the Hawaiian Islands.
 1778: Franco-American alliance signed.
 1778: Spain acquires its first permanent holding in Africa from the Portuguese, which is administrated by the newly-established La Plata Viceroyalty.
 1778: Vietnam is reunified for the first time in 200 years by the Tay Son brothers. The Tây Sơn dynasty has been established, terminated the Lê dynasty
 1779–1879: Xhosa Wars between British and Boer settlers and the Xhosas in the South African Republic.
 1779–1783: Britain loses several islands and colonial outposts all over the world to the combined Franco-Spanish navy.
 1779: Iran enters yet another period of conflict and civil war after the prosperous reign of Karim Khan Zand.

 1780: Outbreak of the indigenous rebellion against Spanish colonization led by Túpac Amaru II in Peru.
 1781: The city of Los Angeles is founded by Spanish settlers.
 1781–1785: Serfdom is abolished in the Austrian monarchy (first step; second step in 1848).
 1782: The Thonburi Kingdom of Thailand is dissolved after a palace coup.
 1783: The Treaty of Paris formally ends the American Revolutionary War.
 1783: Russian annexation of Crimea.
 1785–1791: Imam Sheikh Mansur, a Chechen warrior and Muslim mystic, leads a coalition of Muslim Caucasian tribes from throughout the Caucasus in a holy war against Russian settlers and military bases in the Caucasus, as well as against local traditionalists, who followed the traditional customs and common law (Adat) rather than the theocratic Sharia.
 1785–1795: The Northwest Indian War is fought between the United States and Native Americans.
 1785–1787: The Maratha-Mysore War concludes with an exchange of territories in the Deccan.
 1786–1787: Mozart premieres The Marriage of Figaro and Don Giovanni
 1787: The Tuareg occupies Timbuktu until the 19th century. 
 1787–1792: Russo-Turkish War.
 1788: First Fleet arrives in Australia
 1788–1790: Russo-Swedish War (1788–1790).
 1788–1789: A Qing attempt to reinstall an exiled Vietnamese king in northern Vietnam ends in disaster.
 1789: George Washington is elected the first President of the United States; he serves until 1797.
 1789 : Quang Trung defeated the Qing army
 1789–1799: French Revolution.

 1789: The Liège Revolution.
 1789: The Brabant Revolution.
 1789: The Inconfidência Mineira, an unsuccessful separatist movement in central Brazil led by Tiradentes
 1791: Suppression of the Liège Revolution by Austrian forces and re-establishment of the Prince-Bishopric of Liège.
 1791–1795: George Vancouver explores the world during the Vancouver Expedition.
 1791–1804: The Haitian Revolution.
 1791: Mozart premieres The Magic Flute 
 1792–1802: The French Revolutionary Wars lead into the Napoleonic Wars, which last from 1803–1815.
 1792: The New York Stock & Exchange Board is founded.
 1792: Polish–Russian War of 1792.
 1793: Upper Canada bans slavery.
 1793: The largest yellow fever epidemic in American history kills as many as 5,000 people in Philadelphia, roughly 10% of the population.
 1793–1796: Revolt in the Vendée against the French Republic at the time of the Revolution.
 1794–1816: The Hawkesbury and Nepean Wars, which were a series of incidents between settlers and New South Wales Corps and the Aboriginal Australian clans of the Hawkesbury river in Sydney, Australia. 
 1795: The Marseillaise is officially adopted as the French national anthem.
 1795: The Battle of Nuʻuanu in the final days of King Kamehameha I's wars to unify the Hawaiian Islands.
 1795–1796: Iran invades and devastates Georgia, prompting Russia to intervene and march on Tehran.
 1796: Edward Jenner administers the first smallpox vaccination; smallpox killed an estimated 400,000 Europeans each year during the 18th century, including five reigning monarchs.
 1796: War of the First Coalition: The Battle of Montenotte marks Napoleon Bonaparte's first victory as an army commander.
 1796: The British eject the Dutch from Ceylon and South Africa.
 1796–1804: The White Lotus Rebellion against the Manchu dynasty in China.
 1798: The Irish Rebellion fails to overthrow British rule in Ireland.
 1798–1800: The Quasi-War is fought between the United States and France.
 1799: Dutch East India Company is dissolved.
 1799: Austro-Russian forces under Alexander Suvorov liberates much of Italy and Switzerland from French occupation.
 1799: Coup of 18 Brumaire - Napoleon's coup d'etat brings the end of the French Revolution.
 1799: Death of the Qianlong Emperor after 60 years of rule over China. His favorite official, Heshen, is ordered to commit suicide.
 1800: On 1 January, the bankrupt Dutch East India Company (VOC) is formally dissolved and the nationalised Dutch East Indies are established.

Inventions, discoveries, introductions

 1709: The first piano was built by Bartolomeo Cristofori
 1711: Tuning fork was invented by John Shore
 1712: Steam engine invented by Thomas Newcomen
 1714: Mercury thermometer by Daniel Gabriel Fahrenheit
 1717: Diving bell was successfully tested by Edmond Halley, sustainable to a depth of 55 ft
 c. 1730: Octant navigational tool was developed by John Hadley in England, and Thomas Godfrey in America
 1733: Flying shuttle invented by John Kay
 1736: Europeans encountered rubber – the discovery was made by Charles Marie de La Condamine while on expedition in South America. It was named in 1770 by Joseph Priestley
 c. 1740: Modern steel was developed by Benjamin Huntsman
 1741: Vitus Bering discovers Alaska
 1745: Leyden jar invented by Ewald Georg von Kleist was the first electrical capacitor
 1751: Jacques de Vaucanson perfects the first precision lathe
 1752: Lightning rod invented by Benjamin Franklin
 1753: The first clock  to be built in the New World (North America) was invented by Benjamin Banneker. 
 1755: The tallest wooden Bodhisattva statue in the world is erected at Puning Temple, Chengde, China.
 1764: Spinning jenny created by James Hargreaves brought on the Industrial Revolution
 1765: James Watt enhances Newcomen's steam engine, allowing new steel technologies
 1761: The problem of longitude was finally resolved by the fourth chronometer of John Harrison
 1763: Thomas Bayes publishes first version of Bayes' theorem, paving the way for Bayesian probability
 1768–1779: James Cook mapped the boundaries of the Pacific Ocean and discovered many Pacific Islands
 1774: Joseph Priestley discovers "dephlogisticated air", oxygen
 1775: Joseph Priestley first synthesis of "phlogisticated nitrous air", nitrous oxide, "laughing gas"
 1776:  First improved steam engines installed by James Watt
 1776: Steamboat invented by Claude de Jouffroy
 1777: Circular saw invented by Samuel Miller
 1779: Photosynthesis was first discovered by Jan Ingenhousz
 1781: William Herschel announces discovery of Uranus
 1784: Bifocals invented by Benjamin Franklin
 1784: Argand lamp invented by Aimé Argand
 1785: Power loom invented by Edmund Cartwright
 1785: Automatic flour mill invented by Oliver Evans
 1786: Threshing machine invented by Andrew Meikle
 1787: Jacques Charles discovers Charles's law
 1789: Antoine Lavoisier discovers the law of conservation of mass, the basis for chemistry, and begins modern chemistry
 1798: Edward Jenner publishes a treatise about smallpox vaccination
 1798: The Lithographic printing process invented by Alois Senefelder
 1799: Rosetta Stone discovered by Napoleon's troops

Literary and philosophical achievements

 1703: The Love Suicides at Sonezaki by Chikamatsu first performed
 1704–1717: One Thousand and One Nights translated into French by Antoine Galland. The work becomes immensely popular throughout Europe.
 1704: A Tale of a Tub by Jonathan Swift first published
 1712: The Rape of the Lock by Alexander Pope (publication of first version)
 1719: Robinson Crusoe by Daniel Defoe
 1725: The New Science by Giambattista Vico
 1726: Gulliver's Travels by Jonathan Swift
 1728: The Dunciad by Alexander Pope (publication of first version)
 1744: A Little Pretty Pocket-Book becomes one of the first books marketed for children
 1748: Chushingura (The Treasury of Loyal Retainers), popular Japanese puppet play, composed
 1748: Clarissa by Samuel Richardson
 1749: The History of Tom Jones, a Foundling by Henry Fielding
 1751: Elegy Written in a Country Churchyard by Thomas Gray published
 1751–1785: The French Encyclopédie
 1755: A Dictionary of the English Language by Samuel Johnson
 1758: Arithmetika Horvatzka by Mihalj Šilobod Bolšić
 1759: Candide by Voltaire
 1759: The Theory of Moral Sentiments by Adam Smith
 1759–1767: Tristram Shandy by Laurence Sterne
 1762: Emile: or, On Education by Jean-Jacques Rousseau
 1762: The Social Contract, Or Principles of Political Right by Jean-Jacques Rousseau
 1774: The Sorrows of Young Werther by Goethe first published
 1776: Ugetsu Monogatari (Tales of Moonlight and Rain) by Ueda Akinari
 1776: The Wealth of Nations, foundation of the modern theory of economy, was published by Adam Smith
 1776–1789: The History of the Decline and Fall of the Roman Empire was published by Edward Gibbon
 1779: Amazing Grace published by John Newton
 1779–1782: Lives of the Most Eminent English Poets by Samuel Johnson
 1781: Critique of Pure Reason by Immanuel Kant (publication of first edition)
 1781: The Robbers by Friedrich Schiller first published
 1782: Les Liaisons dangereuses by Pierre Choderlos de Laclos
 1786: Poems, Chiefly in the Scottish Dialect by Robert Burns
 1787–1788: The Federalist Papers by Alexander Hamilton, James Madison, and John Jay
 1788: Critique of Practical Reason by Immanuel Kant
 1789: Songs of Innocence by William Blake
 1789: The Interesting Narrative of the Life of Olaudah Equiano by Olaudah Equiano
 1790: Journey from St. Petersburg to Moscow by Alexander Radishchev
 1790: Reflections on the Revolution in France by Edmund Burke
 1791: Rights of Man by Thomas Paine
 1792: A Vindication of the Rights of Woman by Mary Wollstonecraft
 1794: Songs of Experience by William Blake
 1798: Lyrical Ballads by William Wordsworth and Samuel Taylor Coleridge
 1798: An Essay on the Principle of Population published by Thomas Malthus
 (mid-18th century): The Dream of the Red Chamber (authorship attributed to Cao Xueqin), one of the most famous Chinese novels

Musical works
 1711: Rinaldo, Handel's first opera for the London stage, premiered
 1721: Brandenburg Concertos by J.S. Bach
 1723: The Four Seasons, violin concertos by Antonio Vivaldi, composed
 1724: St John Passion by J.S. Bach
 1727: St Matthew Passion composed by J.S. Bach
 1733: Hippolyte et Aricie, first opera by Jean-Philippe Rameau
 1741: Goldberg Variations for harpsichord published by Bach
 1742: Messiah, oratorio by Handel premiered in Dublin
 1749: Mass in B minor by J.S. Bach assembled in current form
 1751: The Art of Fugue by J.S. Bach
 1762: Orfeo ed Euridice, first "reform opera" by Gluck, performed in Vienna
 1786: The Marriage of Figaro, opera by Mozart
 1787: Don Giovanni, opera by Mozart
 1788: Jupiter Symphony (Symphony No.41) composed by Mozart
 1791: The Magic Flute, opera by Mozart
 1791–1795: London symphonies by Haydn
 1798: The Pathétique, piano sonata by Beethoven
 1798: The Creation, oratorio by Haydn first performed

References

Further reading
 Black, Jeremy and Roy Porter, eds. A Dictionary of Eighteenth-Century World History (1994) 890pp
 Klekar, Cynthia. “Fictions of the Gift: Generosity and Obligation in Eighteenth-Century English Literature.” Innovative Course Design Winner. American Society for Eighteenth-Century Studies: Wake Forest University, 2004. <Home | American Society for Eighteenth-Century Studies (ASECS)>. Refereed.
 Langer, William. An Encyclopedia of World History (5th ed. 1973); highly detailed outline of events online free
 Morris, Richard B. and Graham W. Irwin, eds. Harper Encyclopedia of the Modern World: A Concise Reference History from 1760 to the Present (1970) online
 Milward, Alan S, and S. B. Saul, eds. The economic development of continental Europe: 1780–1870  (1973)   online; note there are two different books with identical authors and slightly different titles. Their coverfage does not overlap.
 Milward, Alan S, and S. B. Saul, eds. The development of the economies of continental Europe, 1850–1914 (1977) online
 The Wallace Collection, London, houses one of the finest collections of 18th-century decorative arts from France, England and Italy, including paintings, furniture, porcelain and gold boxes.

External links 
 

 
2nd millennium
Centuries
Early Modern period